AAH is a pharmaceutical wholesaler in the United Kingdom. Originally formed in 1892 as a company selling solid fuels in South Wales, it was floated on the stock exchange in 1923. It diversified into pharmaceuticals in the 1970s.

History
AAH originated in 1892, when Cleeves Company was formed in Wales, owning about 7,000 acres of land. It merged with two local companies, Gurnos and Gellveeidrim, to form Amalgamated Anthracite Collieries Limited.

The Chairman of the company was Alfred Mond, 1st Baron Melchett, and it was floated on the Stock Exchange on 29 June 1923, having been registered as a public company on 16 June 1923.  The registered office was 29/30 King Street, Cheapside, London. Amalgamated Anthracite Collieries Limited held its first company meeting on 5 September 1923 at the Cannon Street Hotel.

From mid-1925 to at least the end of 1926, all coal mining activities in England had ceased, resulting in major financial problems for the industry.  This was a driving force behind the eventual merger with United Anthracite Collieries Limited.  On 1 July 1927, the company merged with United to become known as A.A.C Anthracite, based at 120 Fenchurch Street.

AAH's original business was producing and distributing anthracite and other solid fuels across South Wales. The company later diversified its interests in different markets including health services, building materials, transport, warehousing and environmental services (landscape conservation and waste disposal). In 1954, it was agreed to change the company name to Amalgamated Anthracite Holdings Limited (AAH). In early 1971 the company abbreviated its name to AAH Limited.

In 1976, AAH sold off its interests in fuel and building materials. Healthcare services became the company's main business activity. AAH expanded its pharmaceutical interest by taking over a large number of businesses including Chemists Holding and Hills Pharmaceuticals.
 
AAH Limited became a constituent company of AAH Holdings in 1981, based in London. In 1985 the headquarters of AAH Holdings plc moved to the south of Lincoln.

In 1985 AAH acquired pharmaceutical wholesaler Vestric Limited from Glaxo P.L.C., which continued the company's growth and led to the formation of AAH Pharmaceuticals Limited.

In 1991, AAH arranged to distribute drugs marketed by ICI to hospitals in Britain, while ICI retained distribution logistics to pharmacies in the country.

In 1999 the headquarters moved to Coventry, where it remains as of 2023.

Branches
The AAH group has several branches. The Enterprise branch sells health and beauty products to over 5,000 independent pharmacies in the UK. The Trident branch is a shortline supplier to independent pharmacies in the UK. Wilkinson Healthcare provides independent pharmacies with surgical services. Dextrous provides logistical services to manufacturers.

It has 19 depots around the UK including locations in Belfast, Glasgow, and Sussex.

See also
 List of pharmaceutical manufacturers in the United Kingdom

References

Further reading 

 
See also 1992 (Vol 2, page 4) and 1991 (Vol 2, page 4)
Records of Annual General Meetings of the Amalgamated Anthracite Collieries, Limited

External links
 AAH
 Celesio UK

Video clips
 Telegraph November 2010

1923 establishments in England
Manufacturing companies based in Coventry
Companies based in Lincoln, England
Pharmaceutical companies established in 1923
Pharmaceutical companies of England